This article contains information about the literary events and publications of 1525.

Events
July – Michelangelo is in the process of working on the Laurentian Library in Florence.
September – William Tyndale's New Testament translation into English is made, but printing in Cologne is interrupted by anti-Lutheran forces. (Copies reach England in 1526.)
unknown dates
 Printing of Huldrych Zwingli's New Testament 'Zürich Bible' translation into German by Christoph Froschauer begins.
Il Petrarco, Allesandro Vellutello's edition of Petrarch first appears. It will be reprinted 29 times in this century.
The anonymous early 14th-century poem King Alexander is first printed.

New books

Prose
Pietro Bembo – Prose nelle quali si ragiona della volgar lingua (Prose della volgar lingua)
Albrecht Dürer – Underweysung der Messung mit dem Zirckel und Richtscheyt (literally, "Instructions for Measuring with Compass and Ruler"; also known as The Four Books on Measurement or The Painter's Manual)
Francesco Giorgi – De harmonia mundi totius
Martin Luther – On the Bondage of the Will (De Servo Arbitrio)
Paracelsus – De septem puncti idolotriae christianae (On the Seven Points of Christian Idolatry)
Antonio Pigafetta – Relazione del primo viaggio intorno al mondo (Report on the First Voyage Around the World; partial publication in Paris)
The Twelve Articles: The Just and Fundamental Articles of All the Peasantry and Tenants of Spiritual and Temporal Powers by Whom They Think Themselves Oppressed

Drama
Niklaus Manuel Deutsch I – Der Ablasskrämer
Niccolò Machiavelli – Clizia

Poetry

Births
March 25 – Richard Edwardes, English choral singer, poet and playwright (died 1566)
Pir Roshan (بايزيد انصاري), Pashtun warrior poet (died 1582/5)
Jan van Casembroot, Flemish noble and poet (died 1568)
probable – Hans Wilhelm Kirchhof, German Landsknecht, baroque poet and translator (died c.1602)

Deaths
May 27 – Thomas Müntzer, German Protestant theologian, radical economist and poet (born c.1489) (executed)
approximate year – Jean Lemaire de Belges, Walloon poet and historian resident in France (born c.1473)

References

1525

1525 books
Years of the 16th century in literature